Jim Marking (April 26, 1927 – January 19, 2013) was an American professional coach, best known for his career at South Dakota State.

Coaching career

High school coaching
A year after Marking graduated from Parkston High School in 1945, he was forced out of the American Navy in August, 1946 and joined South Dakota State College. Meanwhile, stationed at South Dakota College, he coached at Bruce High School and won the High School Championship in 1954. In 1957, Marking moved his success at Watertown High School and again won the High School Championship.

College coaching
He began a professional coaching career at South Dakota and continued his career for 14 years (1960 - 1974) and he won 73.8 percent in his full basketball career.

Personal life
Born in Parkston, South Dakota, Marking lived in Brookings, South Dakota and is survived by his sister, five children, eight grandchildren, five-great grandchildren and his wife Carola Koehn-Marking.

References

1927 births
2013 deaths
American men's basketball coaches
Basketball coaches from South Dakota
Basketball players from South Dakota
High school basketball coaches in the United States
People from Brookings, South Dakota
People from Parkston, South Dakota
South Dakota State Jackrabbits men's basketball coaches
South Dakota State Jackrabbits men's basketball players
American men's basketball players